This was the first edition of the event. Yuki Bhambri won, defeating runner-up Bradley Klahn.

Seeds

Draw

Finals

Top half

Bottom half

References
 Main Draw
 Qualifying Draw

Traralgon Challenger - Singles
2013 Singles
2013 in Australian tennis